Year 1049 (MXLIX) was a common year starting on Sunday (link will display the full calendar) of the Julian calendar.

Events 
 By place 

 Byzantine Empire 
 Spring – Pecheneg Revolt: Emperor Constantine IX decides to transfer 15,000 Pecheneg warriors from their positions in the Balkans, to the eastern front. Upon approaching the Bosporus, the Pechenegs decide to turn back, and march through Bulgaria, until they reach the Byzantine city of Serdia. Later, joined by followers, the Pecheneg tribes raise the banner of revolt in Thrace. 

 Europe 
 January 13 – Theodwin, prince-bishop of Liège, defeats Count Dirk IV of West Frisia near Dordrecht, and restores imperial authority in the Rhine Delta.
 The Republic of Pisa successfully completes the conquest of Sardinia, from the Andalusian occupiers.

 British Isles 
 Viking Irish raiders ally with King Gruffydd ap Rhydderch of Gwent, in raiding along the River Severn.

 Africa 
 The Banu Hilal, a confederation of tribes of Arabia, begin their invasion in the Maghreb (North Africa). They are organized by the Egyptian Fatimid Caliphate to punish their former Zirid vassals.

 Asia 
 The Iron Pagoda in Kaifeng is constructed, during the Chinese Song Dynasty.

 By topic 

 Religion 
 February 12 – Pope Leo IX succeeds Damasus II, as the 152nd pope of the Catholic Church. He goes on a one-year trip to promote the cause of the reformist program among the European prelates.

Births 
 October 9 – Seonjong, king of Goryeo (d. 1094)
 Godelieve, Flemish saint (approximate date)
 Hermann II, count palatine of Lotharingia (d. 1085)
 John Theristus, Italian Benedictine monk (d. 1129)
 Li Gonglin, Chinese painter and antiquarian (d. 1106)
 Peter de Honestis, Italian monk (approximate date)
 Saw Lu, king of the Pagan Kingdom (d. 1084)
 Rhiryd ap Bleddyn, king of Powys (d. 1088)

Deaths 
 January 1 – Odilo of Cluny, French Benedictine abbot
 January 12 – Abū-Sa'īd Abul-Khayr, Persian Sufi poet (b. 967)
 January 13 – Dirk IV, count of Friesland west of the Vlie
 December 1 – Ermesinda of Bigorre, queen of Aragon (b. 1015)
 Airlangga, Indonesian ruler (raja) of Kahuripan 
 Eustace I, count of Boulogne (House of Flanders)

References